North Williams Avenue is a north-south street located in Portland, Oregon, United States, and it defines the eastern boundary of North Portland. It is a street common to the Portland neighborhoods Eliot, Boise, Humboldt, and Piedmont.

History
The town of Albina, Oregon was platted in 1872 by Edwin Russell, William Page, and George Williams, and streets were named for each of the founders. Albina expanded northward in successive plats, resulting in slight misalignments of Williams Avenue at Alberta Street and Dekum Street. In 1891 Albina was annexed into Portland.

In the early 20th century, property owners and politicians sought to restrict access to nonwhites in most residential areas in Portland. In 1919 the Portland Realty Board declared that selling property in a white neighborhood to Negro or Chinese people was unethical, and by 1940, half of Portland's Black community lived in the North Williams Avenue area. The street became known as the central hub of African American Portland.

A redevelopment plan in the late 1980s caused a gradual shift in demographics along North Williams Avenue and the surrounding area. One stretch of the avenue began to carry 3,000 bicycle commuters per day, making the street a vital artery for non-motorized traffic, but changes along North Williams Avenue were not always well received.

Historic resources 
Three sites listed with the National Register of Historic Places are located on North Williams Avenue, the Rinehart Building, the Charles Crook House, and the Henry C. and Wilhemina Bruening House. Moreover, the Portland Historic Resources Inventory of 1984 counted 26 sites of interest on North Williams Avenue.

Public transportation
North Williams Avenue is served by TriMet lines 4 and 44.

Media references
"Williams Avenue" is a song by the Portland band, Quarterflash. It is track #9 on the album, Quarterflash.

See also
 List of streets in Portland, Oregon

References

External links
 Portland Bureau of Transportation documents related to North Williams Avenue
 Gentrification Map showing locations of former homes and businesses owned by African Americans, provided by The Skanner.

African-American history in Portland, Oregon
Boise, Portland, Oregon
Eliot, Portland, Oregon
Humboldt, Portland, Oregon
Piedmont, Portland, Oregon
Streets in Portland, Oregon